English coffeehouses in the 17th and 18th centuries were public social places where men would meet for conversation and commerce. For the price of a penny, customers purchased a cup of coffee and admission. Travellers introduced coffee as a beverage to England during the mid-17th century; previously it had been consumed mainly for its supposed medicinal properties. Coffeehouses also served tea and hot chocolate as well as a light meal.

The historian Brian Cowan describes English coffeehouses as "places where people gathered to drink coffee, learn the news of the day, and perhaps to meet with other local residents and discuss matters of mutual concern." Topics like the Yellow Fever would also be discussed. The absence of alcohol created an atmosphere in which it was possible to engage in more serious conversation than in an alehouse. Coffeehouses also played an important role in the development of financial markets and newspapers.

Topics discussed included politics and political scandals, daily gossip, fashion, current events, and debates surrounding philosophy and the natural sciences. Historians often associate English coffeehouses, during the 17th and 18th centuries, with the intellectual and cultural history of the Age of Enlightenment: they were an alternate sphere, supplementary to the university. Political groups frequently used coffeehouses as meeting places.

Origins

Europeans Learn About Coffee from Empires of Asia
Europeans first learned about coffee consumption and practice through accounts of exotic travels to "oriental" empires of Asia. According to Markman Ellis, travellers accounted for how men would consume an intoxicating liquor, "black in colour and made by infusing the powdered berry of a plant that flourished in Arabia." Native men consumed this liquid "all day long and far into the night, with no apparent desire for sleep but with mind and body continuously alert, men talked and argued, finding in the hot black liquor a curious stimulus quite unlike that produced by fermented juice of grape."

Cowan explains how European perceptions of the initial foreign consumption of coffee was internalised and transformed to mirror European traditions through their acquisition of coffee and its transfusion into popular culture. As such, through Cowan's evaluation of the English virtuosi's utilitarian project for the advancement of learning involving experiments with coffee, this phenomenon is well explained. Sir Francis Bacon  was an important English virtuoso whose vision was to advance human knowledge through the collection and classification of the natural world in order to understand its properties. His work with coffee inspired further research into its medicinal properties. Experiments with coffee led to supposed "cures" for ailments such as "Head-Melancholy", gout, scurvy, smallpox and excessive drunkenness. Adversely, there were those who were cautious of the properties of coffee, fearing they had more unfavourable effects than positive ones. Experimentalists put forth speculations surrounding coffee's consumption. These experimentalists feared that excessive coffee consumption could result in languor, paralysis, heart conditions and trembling limbs, as well as low spiritedness and nervous disorders.

Early Oxford coffeehouses ("penny universities")

During the mid-17th century, coffee was no longer viewed solely as a medicinal plant and this change in perception created a novel opportunity for the serving of coffee to patrons. A ripe location for just such an enterprise was the city of Oxford, with its unique combination of exotic scholarship interests and energetic experimental community. Thus the first English coffeehouse was established in 1650 at the Angel Coaching Inn in Oxford by a Jewish entrepreneur named Jacob. According to Cowan, Oxford was seen as an important fixture for the creation of a distinctive coffeehouse culture throughout the 1650s.  The first coffeehouses established in Oxford were known as penny universities, as they offered an alternative form of learning to structural academic learning, while still being frequented by the English virtuosi who actively pursued advances in human knowledge. The coffeehouses would charge a penny admission, which would include access to newspapers and conversation. Reporters called "runners" went around to the coffeehouses announcing the latest news.

This environment attracted an eclectic group of people who met and mingled with each other. In a society that placed such a high importance on class and economic status, the coffeehouses were unique because the patrons were people from all levels of society. Anyone who had a penny could come inside. Students from the universities also frequented the coffeehouses, sometimes even spending more time at the shops than at school. Cowan states: "The coffeehouse was a place for like-minded scholars to congregate, to read, as well as learn from and to debate with each other, but was emphatically not a university institution, and the discourse there was of a far different order than any university tutorial." Despite later coffeehouses being far more inclusive, early Oxford coffeehouses had an air of exclusivity, catering to the virtuosi. Early Oxford coffeehouse virtuosi included Christopher Wren, Peter Pett, Thomas Millington, Timothy Baldwin, and John Lampshire, to name a few. The memoirs of Anthony Wood and John Evelyn provide evidence of the nature of early Oxford coffeehouses. The early Oxford coffeehouses also helped establish the tone for future coffeehouses in England, as they would differ from other English social institutions such as alehouses and taverns. "The coffeehouse was a place for "virtuosi" and "wits", rather than for the plebes or roués who were commonly portrayed as typical patrons of the alcoholic drinking houses. Ellis concludes, "(Oxford's coffeehouses') power lay in the fact that they were in daily touch with the people. Their purpose was something more than to provide a meeting-place for social intercourse and gossip; there was serious and sober discussion on all matters of common interest."

Early London coffeehouses

The Oxford-style coffeehouses, which acted as a centre for social intercourse, gossip, and scholastic interest, spread quickly to London, where English coffeehouses became popularised and embedded within the English popular and political culture. Pasqua Rosée, a native of Smyrna, western Turkey of a Levant Company merchant named Daniel Edwards, established the first London coffeehouse in 1652. London's second coffeehouse was named the Temple Bar, established by James Farr in 1656.

Initially, there was little evidence to suggest that London coffeehouses were popular and largely frequented, due to the nature of the unwelcome competition felt by other London businesses. When Harrington's Rota Club began to meet in another established London coffeehouse known as the Turk's Head, to debate "matters of politics and philosophy", English coffeehouse popularity began to rise. This club was also a "free and open academy unto all comers" whose raison d'être was the art of debate, characterised as "contentious but civil, learned but not didactic." According to Cowan, despite the Rota's banishment after the Restoration of the monarchy, the discursive framework they established while meeting in coffeehouses set the tone for coffeehouse conversation throughout the rest of the 17th century. By early eighteenth century, London boasted more coffeehouses than any other city in the western world, except for Constantinople.

Popular period

Character

English coffeehouses had a particular character during their height in popularity, spanning from 1660, after the Restoration of the monarchy, until their decline towards the end of the 18th century. Coffeehouses soon became the "town's latest novelty." A relaxed atmosphere, their relative cheapness and frequency contributed to coffeehouse sociability and their rise in demand. Despite two major setbacks faced by the coffeehouses during their height in popularity, the outbreak of the plague of 1665 and the Great Fire of London that followed in 1666, the coffeehouse popularity did not wane. Ellis explains: "Londoners could not be entirely subdued and there were still some who climbed the narrow stairs to their favourite coffeehouses although no longer prepared to converse freely with strangers. Before entering they looked quite around the room, and would not approach even close acquaintances without first inquiring the health of the family at home and receiving assurances of their well-being."

English coffeehouses acted as public houses in which all were welcome, having paid the price of a penny for a cup of coffee. Ellis accounts for the wide demographic of men present in a typical coffeehouse in the post-restoration period: "Like Noah's ark, every kind of creature in every walk of life (frequented coffeehouses). They included a town wit, a grave citizen, a worthy lawyer, a worship justice, a reverend nonconformist, and a voluble sailor." Some historians even claimed that these institutions acted as democratic bodies due to their inclusive nature: "Whether a man was dressed in a ragged coat and found himself seated between a belted earl and a gaitered bishop it made no difference; moreover he was able to engage them in conversation and know that he would be answered civilly."

Coffeehouse conversation was supposed to conform to a particular manner. The language of polite and civil conversation was considered to be essential to the conduct of coffeehouse debate and conversation. There is dispute among historians as to the main role that civility played in polite conversation in coffeehouse conversation and debate. Klein argues the importance of the portrayal of utmost civility in coffeehouse conversation to the public was imperative for the survival of coffeehouse popularity throughout the period of restoration-era anxieties. Cowan applies the term "civility" to coffeehouses in the sense of "a peculiarly urban brand of social interaction which valued sober and reasoned debate on matters of great import, be they scientific, aesthetic, or political." He argues that the underlying rules and procedures which have enabled coffeehouses to "keep undesirable out". These include established rules and procedures as well as conventions outlined by clubs when frequenting coffeehouses, such as Harrington's Rota Club. Cowan argues that these "rules" have had a great impact on coffeehouse sociability. Mackie argues that Addison and Steele's popularised periodicals, The Tatler and The Spectator, infused politeness into English coffeehouse conversation, as their explicit purpose lay in the reformation of English manners and morals. Others still contest the holistic presence of polite civility within coffeehouse conversation. Helen Berry uses the example of Elizabeth Adkins, better known as Moll King, using coffeehouse slang known as "flash" - to counter the axiom of polite culture within coffeehouse culture. Ellis explains that because Puritanism influenced English coffeehouse behaviorisms, intoxicants were forbidden, allowing for respectable sober conversation. He offers an example of one coffeehouse patron who, upon seeking ale within a coffeehouse, was asked to leave and visit a nearby tavern.

Various coffeehouses catered to diverse groups of individuals who focused on specific topics of discussion. The variety of topics and groups to which the coffeehouses catered to offers insight into the non-homogeneous nature of English society during the period in which coffeehouses rose to their peak in popularity. These different coffeehouse characters are evident when evaluating specific coffeehouses in detail during the period. After the Restoration, coffeehouses known as penny universities catered to a range of gentlemanly arts and acted as an alternate centre of academic learning. These included lessons in French, Italian or Latin, dancing, fencing, poetry, mathematics and astronomy. Other coffeehouses acted as a centre for social gathering for less learned men. Helen Berry evaluates one coffeehouse, known as Moll King's coffeehouse, which is depicted to be frequented by lowlifes and drunkards as well as "an unusual wide social mix of male customers, from courtiers to Covent Garden market traders and pimps." It was also frequently associated with prostitution. Customers also habitually engaged in a type of conversation known as "flash", a derivative of criminal speak. Moll King's coffeehouse was used as a case study for Berry to prove that polite conversation was not always used within a coffeehouse setting. Other groups frequented other coffeehouses for various reasons. For example, Child's coffeehouse, "near the Physician's Warwick Lane and St. Paul's church yard", was frequented by the clergy and by doctors."

'Rules'
According to the first posted "Rules and Orders of the Coffee House" illustrated and printed in 1674 as a coffee broadside, equality was supposed to have prevailed amongst all men in these establishments, and "no man of any station need give his place to a finer man". Historians confirm that social status was somewhat ignored, as one could participate in conversation regardless of class, rank, or political leaning. If one should swear, they would have to forfeit a twelve-pence. If a quarrel broke out, the instigator would have to purchase the offended a cup of coffee. The topic of "sacred things" was barred from coffeehouses, and rules existed against speaking poorly of the state as well as religious scriptures. The rules forbade games of chance, such as cards and dice, as well. However, In reality, there were no regulations or rules governing the coffee-houses. [This] satire ironises the very idea of regulating their behaviour.

Financial markets
Frequent consumption of alcohol was common up until the mid-seventeenth century in England. Most people favored watered-down ale or beer instead of London's river water. The arrival of coffee triggered a dawn of sobriety that laid the foundations for truly spectacular economic growth in the decades that followed as people thought clearly for the first time. The stock exchange, insurance industry, and auctioneering: all burst into life in 17th-century coffeehouses — in Jonathan's, Lloyd's, and Garraway's — spawning the credit, security, and markets that facilitated the dramatic expansion of Britain's network of global trade in Asia, Africa and America.

At Lloyd's Coffee House, frequented by merchants and sailors, deals in the shipping industry were conducted. As a result, it became the major insurer Lloyd's of London.

In the 17th century, stockbrokers also gathered and traded in coffee houses, notably Jonathan's Coffee-House, because they were not allowed in the Royal Exchange due to their rude manners.

Print news culture
The English coffeehouse also acted as a primary centre of communication for news. Historians strongly associate English coffeehouses with print and scribal publications, as they were important venues for the reading and distribution of such materials, as well as the gathering of important news information. Most coffeehouses provided pamphlets and newspapers, as the price of admission covered their costs. Patrons perused reading material at their leisure. Coffeehouses became increasingly associated with news culture, as news became available in a variety of forms throughout coffeehouses. These forms include: "Print, both licensed and unlicensed; manuscripts; aloud, as gossip, hearsay, and word of mouth." Runners also went round to different coffeehouses, reporting the latest current events. Circulation of bulletins announcing sales, sailings, and auctions was also common in English coffeehouses.

Richard Steele and Joseph Addison's news publications, The Spectator and the Tatler, were considered the most influential venue of print news that circulated in English coffeehouses. These journals were likely the most widely distributed sources of news and gossip within coffeehouses throughout the early half of the 18th century. Addison and Steele explicitly worked to reform the manners and morals of English society, accomplished through a veiled anecdotal critique of English society. As these anecdotal stories held underlying, rather than explicit, social critiques, "readers were persuaded, not coerced, into freely electing these standards of taste and behaviour as their own." Addison and Steele relied on coffeehouses for their source of news and gossip as well as their clientele, and then spread their news culture back into the coffeehouses as they relied on coffeehouses for their distribution. According to Bramah, the good standing of the press during the days in which Addison and Steele distributed The Tatler and The Spectator in English coffeehouses can be directly attributed to the popularity of the coffeehouse.

The Enlightenment
There is contention among historians as to the extent to which English coffeehouses contributed to the public sphere of the age of Enlightenment. There is no simple and uniform way to describe the Age of Enlightenment; however, historians generally agree that during this period, reason became a substitute for other forms of authority that had previously governed human action, such as religion, superstition, or customs of arbitrary authority. In his analysis of the Enlightenment, Jürgen Habermas argues that the age of Enlightenment had seen the creation of a bourgeois public sphere for the discussion and transformations of opinions. According to Habermas, this 'public realm' "is a space where men could escape from their roles as subjects, and gain autonomy in the exercise and exchange of their own opinions and ideas." Consequently, there is also no simple and uniform 'public sphere', as it can encompass different spheres within, such as an intellectual of political public sphere of the age of Enlightenment.

In regard to English coffeehouses, there is contention among historians as to the extent to which coffeehouses should be considered within the public sphere of the Enlightenment. Dorinda Outram places English coffeehouses within an intellectual public sphere, focusing on the transfusion of enlightened ideas. She justifies her placement of English coffeehouses within an 'intellectual public sphere' by naming them "commercial operations, open to all who could pay and thus provided ways in which many different social strata could be exposed to the same ideas." She also argues that enlightened ideas were transfused through print culture, a culture that became open to larger number of individuals after the 'reading revolution' at the end of the 18th century. According to Outram, as English coffeehouses offered various forms of print items, such as newspapers, journals and some of the latest books, they are to be considered within the public sphere of the Enlightenment. Historian James Van Horn Melton offers another perspective and places English coffeehouses within a more political public sphere of the Enlightenment. According to Melton, English coffeehouses were "born in an age of revolution, restoration, and bitter party rivalries. (They) provided public space at a time when political action and debate had begun to spill beyond the institutions that had traditionally contained them." He uses the fact that Harrington's "arch republican" Rota club met within an early London coffeehouse to discuss political issues as evidence that English coffeehouses were depicted as centres of "religious and political dissent." He also offers evidence that different political groups used the popularity of coffeehouses for their own political ends: Puritans encouraged coffeehouse popularity because proprietors forbade the consumption of alcohol within their establishment, whereas royalist critics associated coffeehouses with incessant and unwarranted political talk by common subjects.

Women

Historians disagree on the role and participation of women within the English coffeehouse. Bramah states that women were forbidden from partaking in coffeehouse activity as customers. Cowan, on the other hand, explains that while coffeehouses were free and open to all subjects despite class, gender, or merit, conversation revolved around male-centred issues such as politics, business and cultural criticism, which were not supposed to concern women and thus their participation within coffeehouses was unwelcomed. Historians depict coffeehouses as a gentlemanly sphere where men could partake in conversation without associating with women; coffeehouses were consequently not considered a place for a lady who wished to preserve her respectability. As such, complaints against the coffeehouse were commonly vocalised by women. Women used subtle arguments against coffeehouse frequenting, as well as coffee consumption, outlined in "The Women's Petition Against Coffee." They protested against the consumption of coffee arguing that it made men sterile and impotent and stated that it contributed to the nation's failing birth rate. According to the petition, coffee made men "as unfruitful as the sandy deserts, from where that unhappy berry is said to be brought." Women also raised protest against the coffeehouse itself as it "provided in times of domestic crisis when a husband should have been attending to his duties at home."

Cowan cites a handful of instances in which women were allowed to frequent English coffeehouses: When partaking in business ventures, in Bath, where female sociability was more readily accepted, in gambling/coffeehouses, and while auctions were held within coffeehouses, as a woman acted in the service of her household. Historians have accounted for female involvement in the male public sphere of the coffeehouse by evaluating female news hawkers who enter temporarily within a male-dominated coffeehouse. Paula McDowell has argued that these women "were anything but the passive distributors of other people's political ideas." In addition, as McDowell's study shows, female hawkers "shap[ed] the modes and forms of political discourse through their understanding of their customer's desires for news and print ephemera." Nonetheless, McDowell and Cowan agree that although female workers may have been physically within the male public sphere of the coffeehouse, their rank and gender prevented them from fully participating within the sphere. The presence of women within coffeehouses in general did not mean that they participated equally in the public sphere of coffeehouses. Cowan points to female proprietors of coffeehouses, known as "coffee-women", as a pertinent example of women's presence in, while not necessarily participating in, the public realm of coffeehouses. They acted as proprietors of the establishment as well as coffee servers, while not necessarily taking part in coffeehouse conversation. Famous female coffeehouse proprietors are Anne Rochford and Moll King, who subsequently became publicly satirised figures.

Decline
Towards the end of the 18th century, coffeehouses had almost completely disappeared from the popular social scene in England. Historians offer a wide range of reasons for the decline of English coffeehouses. Ellis argues that coffeehouse patrons' folly through business endeavours, the evolution of the club and the government's colonial policy acted as the main contributors to the decline of the English coffeehouse. Coffeehouse proprietors worked to gain monopoly over news culture and to establish a coffeehouse newspaper as the sole form of print news available. Met with incessant ridicule and criticism, the proposal discredited coffee-men's social standing. Ellis explains: "Ridicule and derision killed the coffee-men's proposal but it is significant that, from that date, their influence, status and authority began to wane. In short, coffee-men had made a tactical blunder and had overreached themselves." 

The rise of the exclusive gentlemen's club also contributed to the decline in popularity of English coffeehouses. Bramah explains how the coffeehouse rules that had made coffeehouses once accessible meeting places for all sections of society, fell into disuse. "Snobbery reared its head, particularly amongst the intelligentsia, who felt that their special genius entitled them to protection from the common herd. Strangers were no longer welcome." For example, some coffeehouses began charging more than the customary penny to preserve frequent attendance of the higher standing clientele they served. Literary and political clubs rose in popularity, as "the frivolities of coffee-drinking were lost in more serious discussion." 

With increased demand for tea, the government also had a hand in the decline of the English coffeehouse in the 18th century. The British East India Company, at the time, had a greater interest in the tea trade than in the coffee trade, as competition for coffee had heightened internationally with the expansion of coffeehouses throughout the rest of Europe. Government policy fostered trade with India and China, and, according to Ellis, the government offered encouragements to anything that would stimulate demand for tea. Tea had become fashionable at court, and tea houses, which drew their clientele from both sexes, began to grow in popularity. The growing popularity of tea is explained by the ease with which it is prepared. "To brew tea, all that is needed is to add boiling water; coffee, in contrast, required roasting, grinding and brewing." In regards to the decline in coffee culture, Ellis concludes: "They had served their purpose and were no longer needed as meeting-places for political or literary criticism and debate. They had seen the nation pass through one of its greatest periods of trial and tribulation; had fought and won the battle age of profligacy; and had given us a standard of prose-writing and literary criticism unequalled before or since."

See also

 Stuart period
 Tavern

Notes

References
 Berry, Helen. 2001. "Rethinking Politeness in Eighteenth-Century England: Moll King's Coffee House and the significance of 'Flash Talk': The Alexander Prize Lecture." Transactions of the Royal Historical Society. 6th Set., Vol. 11: 65–81.
 Brahma, Edward. Tea and Coffee. A Modern View of Three Hundred Years of Tradition. Tip tree, Essex: Hutchinson & Co, Ltd.
 Cessford, C., Hall, A., Herring, V., & Newman, R. 2017. “'To Clapham's I go': a mid to late 18th-century Cambridge coffeehouse assemblage.”Post-Medieval Archaeology. No.51(2): 372–426.
 Cowan, Brian William. 2005. The Social Life of Coffee: The Emergence of the British Coffeehouse. New Haven: Yale University Press.
 Cowan, Brian. 2004. "The Rise of the Coffeehouse Reconsidered" Historical Journal 47#1 (2004) pp. 21–46 online
 Cowan, Brian William. 2001. "What Was Masculine about the Public Sphere? Gender and the Coffeehouse Milieu in Post-Restoration England." History Workshop Journal. No. 51: 127–157. online
 Ellis, Aytoun. 1956. The Penny Universities; A History of the Coffee-houses. London: Decker & War-burg.
 Ellis, Markman. 2004. The coffee-house: a cultural history. Weidenfeld & Nicolson.
 Klein, Lawrence. E. 1996. "Coffeehouse Civility, 1660–1714: An Aspect of Post-Courtly Culture in England." The Huntington Library Quarterly. 59#1 pp 30–51. online
 McDowell, Paula. 1998. The Women of Grub Street: Press, Politics, and Gender in the London Literary Marketplace, 1678-1730. Oxford: Clarendon Press.
 Outram, Dorinda. 1995. The Enlightenment. Cambridge: Cambridge University Press.
 Pendergrast, Mark.  Uncommon Grounds: The History of Coffee and How It Transformed Our World (1999).
 Robinson, Edward Forbes. 1893.  The early history of coffee houses in England; with some account of the first use of coffee and a bibliography of the subject (1893) online
 Van Horne Melton, James. 2001. The Rise of the Public in Enlightenment Europe. Cambridge: Cambridge University Press.
 Lillywhite, Bryant. 1963. London Coffeehouses. A Reference Book of Coffee Houses of the Seventeenth, Eighteenth and Nineteenth Centuries. London: George Allen and Unwind, Ltd.

History of coffee
Coffee culture

17th century in England
18th century in England